The Maimed snake eel (Muraenichthys schultzei, also known as the Aimed snake eel, the Bleeker's worm-eel, or the Schultz's worm eel) is an eel in the family Ophichthidae (worm/snake eels). It was described by Pieter Bleeker in 1857. It is a marine, tropical eel which is known from the Indo-Pacific, including the Red Sea, East Africa, Samoa, the Ryukyu Islands, Australia, and Micronesia.

The Maimed snake eel is of minor commercial interest to fisheries. It is usually bagged, netted or dug out, and sold for shark bait.

References

Fish described in 1857
Muraneichthys